Darwin Laylo (born 1980) is a Filipino chess grandmaster.

Laylo won the Philippine national championship in 2004 and 2006. These wins earned him a place on the Philippine teams in the 2004 Calvià Olympiad and in 2006 at Turin.

In 2006 he gained two GM norms, the first from the 2006 Malaysian Open, and the second at the 2006 Bad Wiessee tournament in Germany. His third and final norm came in the 2007 Asian Chess Championship in Cebu, Philippines.

Laylo placed in the top ten of the 2007 Asian Chess Championship, earning a place in the 2007 World Chess Cup, November, 2007, in Khanty-Mansiysk, Russia. Seeded 113th out of 128 participants, Laylo was eliminated in the first round, 1½–½, by the French grandmaster Étienne Bacrot.

In 2008, he tied for 3rd-7th with Ashot Nadanian, Marat Dzhumaev, Dražen Sermek and Susanto Megaranto in the 5th Dato' Arthur Tan Malaysia Open Championship in Kuala Lumpur. In 2009, he came first in the Zonal tournament in Ho Chi Minh City.

Chess career

Chess Olympiad
{|class="wikitable" style="text-align: left;"
|-
! Event
! Board
! Individual result
! Team result
|-
|Olympiad, Calvia 2004 || Second Reserve || 4.5/8 (26th) || 19th
|-
|Olympiad, Turin 2006 || Fourth || 3.5/7 || 44th
|-
|Olympiad, Dresden 2008 || Reserve || 3.5/8 (20th) || 46th
|-
|Olympiad, Khanty-Mansiysk 2010|| Third || 4/8 (39th) || 50th
|}

Asian Cities Chess Championship
{|class="wikitable" style="text-align: left;"
|-
! Event
! Board
! Individual result
! Team result
|-
|Asian Cities, Jakarta 2011 || Fourth || 6/9 Bronze || 4th
|-
|Asian Cities, Tagaytay 2013 || Fourth || 6.5/9 Bronze || Gold
|}

Asian Individual Chess Championship
{|class="wikitable" style="text-align: left;"
|-
! Event
! ELO Rating
! Result / # of Participants
! TPR
|-
|Cebu City Asian Chess Championship (6th) 2007 || 2486 || 7.5/11 (7th/72) || 2631
|-
|Subic Bay Freeport Zone Asian Chess Championship (7th) 2009 || 2509 || 6.0/11 (34th/86) || 2495
|-
|Subic Bay Freeport Zone Asian Chess Championship (8th) 2010 || 2527 || 5.0/9 (37th/90) || 2474
|-
|Mashhad Asian Chess Championship (9th) 2011 || 2516 || 4.5/9 (22nd/50) || 2465
|-
|Ho Chi Minh City Asian Chess Championship (10th) 2012 || 2502 || 4.0/9 (46th/72) || 2384
|-
|Subic Bay Freeport Zone Asian Chess Championship (11th) 2013 || 2504 || 5.0/9 (28th/77) || 2442
|- 
|Xingtai Asian Chess Championship (17th) 2019 || 2433 || 5.0/9 (27th/74) || 2510
|}

Asian Games
{|class="wikitable" style="text-align: left;"
|-
! Event
! Board
! Individual Score
! Team result
|-
|Asian Games, Doha 2006 || First || 5/9 (55.6%) || 8th 
|-
|Asian Games, Tagaytay 2013 || Fourth || 1/4 (25.0%) || Silver 
|}

Asian Club Chess Cup
{|class="wikitable" style="text-align: left;"
|-
! Event
! Board
! Individual result
! Team result
|-
|Asian Club, Al-Ain 2008 || Fourth || 5.5/7 Bronze || 4th 
|}

HDBank International Chess Open
{|class="wikitable" style="text-align: left;"
|-
! Event
! Starting Rank / ELO
! Score
! Result / TPR
|-
|HDBank Open 2011 || 9th / 2516 || 4.0/9 || 42nd / 2350 
|-
|HDBank Open 2013 || 17th / 2496 || 5.5/9 || 25th / 2446 
|-
|HDBank Open 2015 || 10th / 2499 || 5.5/9 || 14th / 2448 
|-
|HDBank Open 2017 || 29th / 2445 || 4.5/9 || 52nd / 2302 
|-
|HDBank Open 2019 || 36th / 2430 || 4.5/9 || 63rd / 2390 
|}

References

External links
 
 

1980 births
Living people
Filipino chess players
Chess grandmasters
Chess Olympiad competitors
Asian Games medalists in chess
Asian Games silver medalists for the Philippines
Chess players at the 2006 Asian Games
Chess players at the 2010 Asian Games
Medalists at the 2010 Asian Games
Southeast Asian Games medalists in chess
Southeast Asian Games bronze medalists for the Philippines
Competitors at the 2011 Southeast Asian Games
Competitors at the 2021 Southeast Asian Games
20th-century Filipino people
21st-century Filipino people